Corey Surrency (born December 22, 1984) is an American football wide receiver who is currently a free agent. He played junior college football with El Camino College in which he had 30 receptions for over 670 yards in 2007. He committed to FSU after decommiting from Colorado.

Early years
Surrency grew up in Miami; he dropped out of high school in 9th grade and had trouble with the law, including 90 days in jail for various offenses, including felonies. He decided to return to school and obtained his high school diploma.

Florida State Career
Surrency arrived at FSU in early July 2008, later than other recruits due to the death of his mother and the completion of his AA. Surrency expected to put up 1,000 yards and 8 or 9 touchdowns and break the "curse" on the #1 jersey at FSU.

Surrency caused controversy thanks to a little-known NCAA rule entitled Participation After 21st Birthday. The rule states that if an individual participates in an organized sport after his 21st birthday, but before enrolling in college, that participation "shall count as one year of varsity competition in that sport." Surrency, who is 24, had played two seasons with a semi-professional team after he left junior college. If he loses his appeal, Surrency would lose a year of eligibility. Surrency was unsuccessful in his appeal.

References

1984 births
Living people
American football wide receivers
El Camino Warriors football players
Florida State Seminoles football players
Tampa Bay Storm players
Dallas Vigilantes players
Nebraska Danger players
Sioux Falls Storm players
Miami Southridge Senior High School alumni
Players of American football from Miami